Hendrik Martz (born 9 May 1968 in Hamburg) is a German actor.

Life 
Martz works as actor on German television.

Filmography 

 1984: Patrik Pacard - role: Patrik Pacard
 1986–1990: Die Wicherts von nebenan - role: Andy Wichert
 1987: Großstadtrevier (two times)
 1987: Der Landarzt - role: Eike Matthiesen
 1989: Tatort (episode Kopflos)
 1994: Elbflorenz
 1995: Gegen den Wind - role: Tjard
 1995: Dr. Stefan Frank
 1996: SK-Babies
 1998–2000: Verbotene Liebe
 1999: Der Landarzt - role: Eike Matthiesen
 1999: Die Wache
 2003: Unser Charly
 2004: Alphateam
 2007: Der Goldene Nazivampir von Absam 2 – Das Geheimnis von Schloß Kottlitz
 2010: Kaiserschmarrn
 2012: Nord Nord Mord

External links 
 
 website of his band „Band deutscher Mädels“
 Hendrik Martz on agentur-website

German male television actors
Male actors from Hamburg
1968 births
Living people